In Buddhism, conceptual proliferation or, alternatively, mental proliferation or conceptual elaboration, refers to conceptualization of the world through language and concepts which can then be a cause for suffering to arise.  The translation of papañca as conceptual proliferation was first made by Katukurunde Nyanananda Thera in his research monograph Concept and Reality.

The term is mentioned in a variety of suttas in the Pali canon, such as the Madhupindika Sutta (MN 18), and is mentioned in Mahayana Buddhism as well. When referencing the concepts derived from this process, such concepts are referred to in Pali as papañca-saññā-sankhā. Nippapañca is the diametrical opposition of papañca.

Theravada Buddhist monk Chandima Gangodawila writes:

Papañca is one of the most helpful Theravāda Buddhist teachings used to understand how our thoughts become impure and the most compelling account of this subject is the Madhupiṇḍika Sutta. Since many writers don't utilize papañca when alluding to defilements, many readers discover the setting of mental purification hard to understand. If we seriously want to learn how to keep our mental purification unadulterated from defilements, we should figure out how the mental purification can be tainted through papañca.

In addition, Chandima examines the association of papañca to kilesa (defilements), upakkilesa (mental impurities), saññā (perceptions) and abhiññā (comprehensions) to find out whether or not the essential components of mental purification begin from managing papañca, or the other dhamma concepts, that can be bold for anyone who struggles to subsume defilements in modern-day life.

See also
 Make a mountain out of a molehill
 Monkey mind
 Nibbāna: The Mind Stilled
 Reification (fallacy)

Notes

References

External links
 Exploring the Honeyball Sutta, An Alternative Nidana Chain  a more intelligible audio version
 Getting Away From Prapanca, The Practical Applications of the Honeyball Sutta a more intelligible audio version
 Dharma talk on papañca by Christina Feldman

Buddhist philosophical concepts